Károly Kiss (24 September 1903 – 3 December 1983) was a Hungarian politician, who served as Minister of Foreign Affairs between 1951 and 1952. He was a member of the Communist Party of Hungary since 1922. He was imprisoned for nine years because of his illegal communist activities until 1944. After that he participated in the guerrilla movements against the fascist forces. After the ministership he served as Deputy Prime Minister from 1953.

References

 Magyar Életrajzi Lexikon

1903 births
1983 deaths
People from Bicske
People from the Kingdom of Hungary
Social Democratic Party of Hungary politicians
Hungarian Communist Party politicians
Members of the Hungarian Working People's Party
Members of the Hungarian Socialist Workers' Party
Foreign ministers of Hungary
Members of the National Assembly of Hungary (1945–1947)
Members of the National Assembly of Hungary (1947–1949)
Members of the National Assembly of Hungary (1949–1953)
Members of the National Assembly of Hungary (1953–1958)
Members of the National Assembly of Hungary (1958–1963)
Members of the National Assembly of Hungary (1963–1967)
Hungarian prisoners and detainees